Operation Horseshoe was a 1999 alleged plan to ethnically cleanse Albanians in Kosovo. The plan was to be carried out by Serbian police and the Yugoslav army.

In 2011, former Bulgarian Foreign Minister Nadezhda Mihaylova (Neynsky) revealed in a TV documentary that the Bulgarian government had turned over to Germany an unverified report compiled by its military agency which "made clear" the existence of the plan, even though the military intelligence warned that the information could not be verified.

History
In a press conference on 6 April 1999, German Foreign Minister Joschka Fischer stated that the German government had information that the Yugoslav government had been planning a massive ethnic cleansing operation in Kosovo codenamed "Horseshoe" since 26 February 1999 and had started to implement the operation in March 1999 before the peace talks in France had concluded. Fischer accused Milošević of engaging in "ethnic warfare" directed against his own people in which a whole ethnic group had become the "victim of systematic expulsion" to "reorient the political geography" of Kosovo.

In a press conference on 9 April 1999, German Defense Minister Rudolf Scharping provided further details. He presented maps containing the names of towns and villages that showed arrows representing Yugoslav army and police militia units progressively encircling Kosovo in a horseshoe-shaped pincer movement. Scharping stated, "Operation Horseshoe provided clear evidence that President Milosevic (sic) had long been preparing the expulsions from Kosovo and that he had simply used the time gained by the Rambouillet peace talks to organise army and police units for the campaign".

Contemporaneous reports from other countries supported Fischer's allegations. The Times of London reported on 8 April 1999 that "The CIA was aware as early as last autumn of a plan, codenamed Operation Horseshoe, to kill or drive them out over several months. A village a day was the rate that Mr Milosevic (sic) calculated the West would wring its hands over without acting." The British Foreign Secretary Robin Cook told a UK parliamentary committee "that there was a plan developed in Belgrade known as Operation Horseshoe which was for the cleansing of Kosovo of its Kosovo population. That plan has been around for some time". 

However, in 2012 former Bulgarian Foreign Minister Nadezhda Neynsky acknowledged that the Bulgarian government had delivered information to Germany and NATO about Milošević's alleged plan for the ethnic cleaning of Kosovo. This was in contrast to a statement made by a spokesman for the Bulgarian Foreign Ministry in March 2000, which denied that Neynsky (then Mihaylova) had handed over information to the German Foreign Minister Joschka Fischer. In 2012 Neynsky stressed that Fischer took the report of the Bulgarian military intelligence very seriously, although Bulgarian military intelligence had warned that the information could not be verified.

Yugoslav Army military operations

Operations before NATO intervention

Daniel L. Byman and Kenneth M. Pollack date Operation Horseshoe's effective beginning to the summer of 1998, when hundreds of thousands of Kosovar Albanians were driven from their homes. Hanspeter Neuhold stated that KLA attacks after the Holbrooke-Milošević Agreement of October 1998 resulted in new Serb offensives which culminated in Operation Horseshoe directed not only against KLA fighters but also including systematic expulsions of Kosovar civilians. Michael J. Dziedzic stated that the Serbian offensive, known as Operation Horseshoe, was already in motion on 20 March 1999.

The UK Parliament Select Committee on Foreign Affairs cited an Organization for Security and Co-operation in Europe report concluding that before the start of the NATO bombing, the Serbian military campaign did not appear to be oriented towards cantonization (i.e. "aiming to bring together localities according to their ethnic composition") but rather consisted of

 "activity wherever there was KLA activity, and wherever it was suspected there were KLA sympathisers;
 efforts to control the main communication routes;
 with the approach of the bombing, securing Kosovo's borders."

Operations after NATO intervention
Jeremy Black and John Norris both state that after the beginning of NATO bombing of Yugoslavia on 24 March 1999, Serbian forces accelerated Operation Horseshoe. 

The UK Parliament Select Committee on Foreign Affairs stated that "regardless of whether Operation Horseshoe really existed," after the bombing began, "expulsions took place in practically every municipality."

According to the verdict of the ICTY, while there is no mention of Operation Horseshoe per se,

Number of refugees

According to the United Nations High Commissioner for Refugees, by March 1999 (prior to NATO bombing), more than 200,000 Albanian civilians were internally displaced, almost 70,000 Albanians had fled the province to neighboring countries and Montenegro, and a further 100,000 Yugoslav nationals, mostly Kosovar Albanians, had sought asylum in Western Europe. Also, thousands of ethnic Albanian villages in Kosovo had been partially or completely destroyed by burning or shelling.

Within three weeks of the start of NATO strategic bombing during the Kosovo War, there were 525,787 refugees from Kosovo in neighboring countries. A month later, on 12 May, the total number of refugees had risen to 781,618. By June 1999, the Yugoslav military, Serbian police and paramilitaries expelled 862,979 Albanians from Kosovo; the claim was disputed by many Serbian politicians. and several hundred thousand more were internally displaced, in addition to those displaced prior to March. 

Approximately 440,000 refugees crossed the border to Albania and 320,000 to Macedonia. Montenegro hosted around 70,000 refugees, and Bosnia and Herzegovina received more than 30,000. Amnesty International estimated that "nearly one million people have been forced to flee Kosovo".

Radio Television of Serbia never showed the columns of Albanians expelled by Serbian police and paramilitaries except when a convoy of fleeing Albanians was killed by NATO bombs. Moreover, Milošević's propaganda tried to convince the international public that huge columns of refugees fleeing Kosovo were because of NATO's bombing, not Yugoslav Army military operations.

Indictments and Verdicts
The International Criminal Tribunal for the Former Yugoslavia charged Slobodan Milošević and other Yugoslav officials with crimes against humanity including murder, forcible population transfer, deportation and persecution of Kosovo civilians. Kelly M. Greenhill observed that Operation Horseshoe was not included in this indictment.

Upon the conclusion of the trial, Presiding Judge Iain Bonomy stated that "It was the deliberate actions of these forces during this campaign that caused the departure of at least 700,000 Kosovo Albanians from Kosovo in the short period of time between the end of March and beginning of June 1999":

 Slobodan Milošević, President of Yugoslavia and Supreme Commander of the Yugoslav Army - died in 2006 during trial.
 Dragoljub Ojdanić, Chief of General Staff - sentenced to 15 years in prison; granted early release in August 2013.
 Nebojša Pavković, Commander of Third Army, which was responsible for Kosovo - sentenced to 22 years in prison.
 Vladimir Lazarević, Commander of the Pristina Corps of Third Army - sentenced to 15 years in prison; granted early release, having served two thirds of his sentence, on 7 September 2015, effective 3 December 2015.
 Vlajko Stojiljković, Interior Minister and Commander of the Serbian police - committed suicide in 2002, after the adoption of a law on cooperation with the Hague Tribunal.
 Sreten Lukić, Chief of Staff of the Serbian Police in Kosovo - sentenced to 22 years in prison. Upon appeal, the sentence was reduced on 23 January 2014 to 20 years.
 Nikola Šainović, Deputy Prime Minister of Yugoslavia - sentenced to 22 years in prison. On 26 August 2015, three months after the request by his lawyers, he was released from the prison after serving (including pretrial detention and time served) two thirds of his sentence.
 Milan Milutinović, President of the Republic of Serbia - acquitted.

Controversy
The existence of Operation Horseshoe was immediately denied by the Yugoslav officials. Slobodan Milošević labeled it as a "fabrication of the German Defence Ministry". Milošević denied a policy of ethnic cleansing during the NATO bombing in Kosovo and stated that "when aggression stops, when bombing stops, then it will be very easy to continue (the) political process".

Ratomir Tanić, a witness at Milošević's subsequent war crimes trial, said that Horseshoe was a colloquial nickname for a "completely different" Yugoslav army plan that should come into effect only if the ethnic Albanian population took the side of the foreign aggressor in case of aggression on Yugoslavia. The Army would then "neutralising the Albanian strongholds". Tanić stated that the army leadership did not use this plan during the Kosovo War "because there was no external aggression or Albanian rebellion".

In April 2000, Heinz Loquai, a retired German brigadier general, published a book on the war that claimed that the German government's account had been based on a general analysis by a Bulgarian intelligence agency of Yugoslav behaviour in the war that was turned into a specific "plan" by the German Defence Ministry. According to Loquai, the Bulgarian analysis concluded that the goal of the Yugoslav government was to destroy the Kosovo Liberation Army, not to expel the entire Albanian population. He also pointed to a factual flaw in the German government's presentation by naming the plan "Potkova", which is the Croatian and Bulgarian word for horseshoe, but the Serbian word is potkovica.

In a 2008 article published in the European Journal of Communication, Mark A. Wolfgram observed that

Aftermath 
It is unclear how much advance planning there was for the alleged ethnic cleansing of Kosovo, but the removal of ethnic Albanians was counterproductive as, according to British reporter and political analyst Tim Judah, it removed any possibility that Serbia would be allowed to retain control of Kosovo. The government of Serbia did not expect NATO to initiate its bombing campaign. The systematic destruction of Kosovo Albanian identity documents would have made it more difficult for them to prove their citizenship.

See also
 Ethnic cleansing
 Identity cleansing
 Joint Criminal Enterprise
 Propaganda in the Yugoslav Wars
 War crimes in the Kosovo War

References

External links
 Operation Horseshoe (Committee on Foreign Affairs Report)
 Milosevic and Operation Horseshoe, The Guardian, 18 July 1999
 Erasing History: Ethnic Cleansing in Kosovo (Report released by the U.S. Department of State)
 "Operation Horseshoe" —propaganda and reality (World Socialist Web Site)

Ethnic cleansing in the Yugoslav Wars
Military operations of the Kosovo War